El Guettar is a town in central Tunisia in Gafsa Governorate. It is traditionally known for its pistachio nuts.

History

In the 1950s, archaeologists found a crown of balls, 4,000 silex, mammal's teeth and bones of animals laid out near a dried up watering hole which is some 40,000 years old.  Testimony of devotion with regard to a spirit of the waters, source of any life, and ruins which may constitute the oldest religious "building" known in the world (Hermaïon of El Guettar).

The town was the site of a major World War II battle between American forces under George S. Patton, and elements of the German Afrika Korps led by general Jürgen von Arnim, as well as Italian forces led by General Giovanni Messe in early 1943. The battle was later dramatized in the 1970 war film Patton.

See also
Culture of Tunisia
Battle of El Guettar

Communes of Tunisia
Populated places in Gafsa Governorate